The Castle of Dark is a novel by Tanith Lee published in 1978.

Plot summary
The Castle of Dark is a novel in which a magical harpist must rescue a maiden from a castle.

Reception
Dave Langford reviewed The Castle of Dark for White Dwarf #58, and stated that "Fluid writing and effortless atmosphere make this a success."

Colin Greenland reviewed The Castle in the Dark for Imagine magazine, and stated that "Tanith lee starts with the most traditional of material, pure Brothers Grimm; but she goes over and over it, peeling away layer after layer of assumptions and illusions, inverting our expectations of good and evil time and time again. There's nothing simple about a fairytale by the time she's told it."

Reviews
Review by Pamela Cleaver (1979) in Foundation, #16 May 1979
Review by Faren Miller (1984) in Locus, #286 November 1984
Review by Brian Stableford (1984) in Fantasy Review, December 1984

References

1978 British novels
1978 fantasy novels
British fantasy novels
Macmillan Publishers books